Frederick Horsman (12 December 1889 – 15 May 1959) was an English professional footballer. He played as a full back in the Southern League for Watford, and later in the Football League for Watford, Doncaster Rovers, and Luton Town. He played in Watford's first ever Football League match, a 2–1 win against Queens Park Rangers on 28 August 1920.

References

1889 births
1959 deaths
Footballers from Leeds
English footballers
Association football fullbacks
Mansfield Town F.C. players
Grantham Town F.C. players
Watford F.C. players
Doncaster Rovers F.C. players
Luton Town F.C. players
Chatham Town F.C. players
Peterborough & Fletton United F.C. players
Ashford Railway Works F.C. players
Southern Football League players
English Football League players